Adam Andruszkiewicz (born 30 June 1990 in Grajewo) is a far-right Polish politician, who has been the President of the All-Polish Youth (Polish: Młodzież Wszechpolska) from 2015 to 2016, Member of the Polish Parliament (Polish: Sejm) of the VIII term, President of the Stowarzyszenie Endecja and Vice President of the Komisja Łączności z Polakami za Granicą (English: Commission on Communications with Poles Living Abroad).

Andruszkiewicz used to be in the National Movement and leader of the nationalist All-Polish Youth, but he left these organizations in 2018 to join Free and Solidary and, later, Law and Justice.

Career
In 2015 Andruszkiewicz showed his support for the Prime Minister candidate, Paweł Kukiz.

In 2018 he left Kukiz 15 movement and later he joined to Free and Solidary.

In 2018 he has been appointed as the vice Minister of Digitization (Poland).

References

1990 births
Living people
People from Grajewo
University of Białystok alumni
Far-right politics in Poland
Kukiz'15 politicians
Law and Justice politicians
Members of the Polish Sejm 2015–2019
Members of the Polish Sejm 2019–2023